Gottfried Münzenberg (born 17 March 1940) is a German physicist.   

He studied physics at Justus-Liebig-Universität in Giessen and Leopold-Franzens-Universität Innsbruck and completed his studies with a Ph.D. at the University of Giessen, Germany, in 1971. In 1976, he moved to the department of nuclear chemistry at GSI in Darmstadt, Germany, which was headed by Peter Armbruster. He played a leading role in the construction of SHIP, the 'Separator of Heavy Ion Reaction Products'. He was the driving force in the discovery of the cold heavy ion fusion and the discovery of the elements bohrium (Z = 107), hassium (Z = 108), meitnerium (Z = 109), darmstadtium (Z = 110), roentgenium (Z = 111), and copernicium (Z = 112). In 1984, he became head of the new GSI project, the fragment separator, a project which opened new research topics, such as interactions of relativistic heavy ions with matter, production and separation of exotic nuclear beams and structure of exotic nuclei. He directed the Nuclear Structure and Nuclear Chemistry department of the GSI and was professor of physics at the University of Mainz until he retired in March 2005.

Gottfried Münzenberg was born into a family of Protestant ministers (father Pastor Heinz and mother Helene Münzenberg). All his life he has been deeply concerned about the philosophical and theological implications of physics.

Among the rewards he received should be mentioned the Röntgen-Prize of the University of Giessen in 1983 and (together with Sigurd Hofmann) the Otto Hahn Prize of the City of Frankfurt am Main in 1996.

References

Sources
 Gottfried Münzenberg: "Stigmatisch fokussierendes Teilchenspektrometer mit Massen- und Energiedispersion", Ph.D. thesis, Giessen, 1971
 
 
 
 

1940 births
Living people
People from Nordhausen, Thuringia
People from the Province of Saxony
20th-century German physicists
Discoverers of chemical elements
University of Giessen alumni
University of Innsbruck alumni
Academic staff of Johannes Gutenberg University Mainz